This list is of the Cultural Properties of Japan designated in the category of  for the Prefecture of Ehime.

National Cultural Properties
As of 1 February 2015, one National Treasure has been designated.

Prefectural Cultural Properties
As of 10 December 2014, four properties has been designated at a prefectural level.

See also
 Cultural Properties of Japan
 List of National Treasures of Japan (archaeological materials)
 List of Historic Sites of Japan (Ehime)
 List of Cultural Properties of Japan - historical materials (Ehime)

References

External links
  Cultural Properties in Ehime Prefecture

History of Ehime Prefecture
Archaeological materials,Ehime
Ehime,Cultural Properties